Roscidotoga is a genus of moths of the family Nepticulidae.

Species
Roscidotoga callicomae Hoare, 2000
Roscidotoga eucryphiae Hoare, 2000
Roscidotoga lamingtonia Van Nieukerken, Van den Berg & Hoare, 2011
Roscidotoga sapphiripes Hoare, 2000

External links
Australian Faunal Directory

Nepticulidae
Monotrysia genera